The War of Attrition was a limited war fought between Israel and Egypt from 1967 to 1970.

War of Attrition may also refer to:
Attrition warfare, the military strategy of wearing down the enemy by continual losses in personnel and material
War of attrition (game), a model of aggression in game theory, formulated by John Maynard Smith
War of Attrition (album), a 2007 album by death metal band Dying Fetus
War of Attrition (horse), Irish racehorse, winner of 2006 Cheltenham Gold Cup

See also
 Attrition (disambiguation)
 War (disambiguation)